Crassicorophium crassicorne is a species of amphipod crustacean. C. crassicorne occurs on American and European coasts from Norway to the Black Sea.

References

Corophiidea
Crustaceans of the Atlantic Ocean
Crustaceans described in 1859